The 2013 South Sydney Rabbitohs season was the 104th in the club's history. Coached by Michael Maguire and captained by John Sutton, they competed in the National Rugby League's 2013 Telstra Premiership, finishing the regular season in second place.

Pre-season

In 2013, the Rabbitohs again competed in three pre-season trial matches.

Regular season

Finals Series

Ladder

Transfers
Gains

Losses

Player statistics

Representative honours

References

South Sydney Rabbitohs seasons
South Sydney Rabbitohs season